

National team

Intercontinental Futsal Cup

European Cup Winners' Cup
1st Futsal Cup Winners Cup (unofficial)

UEFA Futsal Cup

Top League

10th Russian futsal championship 2001/2002

Regular season

Playoffs Bracket

National Cup

Final Four

First League. Division A

First League. Division B

Women's League
10th Russian women futsal championship 2001/2002

Women's National Cup

References

Russia
Seasons in Russian futsal
futsal
futsal